Cindy may refer to:

People
Cindy (given name), a list of people named Cindy, Cindi, Cyndi or Cyndy
Tugiyati Cindy (born 1985), Indonesian footballer

Music 
 Cindy (musical), an off-Broadway production in 1964 and 1965
"Cindy" (folk song), American folk song (also known as "Cindy, Cindy")
"Cindy, Oh Cindy", 1956 adaptation of the folk song "Pay Me My Money Down"
"Cindy", song by C. Jérôme	M. Mesure, J. Albertini, F. Richard; #6 in France 1976
"Cindy", 1976 song written by Peter, Sue and Marc Reber, Zukocski; also performed by The Cats
"Cindy", 2000 song by American rock band Tammany Hall NYC
"Cindy", a song by Bruce Springsteen from his 2015 album The Ties That Bind: The River Collection

Other
 Cindy, an episode of the American TV series Highway to Heaven
 Cindy (film), 1978 TV movie adaptation of the Cinderella story
 Cindy, a male dolphin that informally married a human, see Human–animal marriage
 Hurricane Cindy (disambiguation)

See also
 CINDI (Coupled Ion-Neutral Dynamics Investigation), a NASA mission
 Heciyê Cindî (1908-1990), Kurdish writer, linguist and researcher
 Sindy, a British doll